Ziar (also Romanized as Zīār, Zeyār, and Zīyār;  is a city in Baraan-e Jonubi Rural District, in the Central District of Isfahan County, Isfahan Province, Iran. At the 2006 census, its population was 3,520, in 927 families.

References 

Populated places in Isfahan County
Cities in Isfahan Province